Ambrizal Ammar (born 1 February 1981) is an Indonesian former footballer who plays as a centre-back.

Club career 
On December 9, 2014, he signed again with Persija Jakarta.

Honours

Club
Sriwijaya
 Liga Indonesia: 2007–08
 Piala Indonesia (3): 2007–08, 2008–09, 2010

References

External links 
 
 Ambrizal at Liga Indonesia

Indonesian footballers
People from Palembang
Sportspeople from Riau
1981 births
Living people
PSPS Pekanbaru players
Semen Padang F.C. players
Sriwijaya F.C. players
Persija Jakarta players
Gresik United players
Persebaya Surabaya players
Liga 1 (Indonesia) players
Indonesia international footballers
Association football defenders